Baekbyeongsan is a hill in the city of Taebaek, Gangwon-do in South Korea.

See also
List of mountains in Korea

Notes

References
 

Mountains of South Korea
Mountains of Gangwon Province, South Korea
Taebaek
One-thousanders of South Korea